Katia Giselle Escalera is a Bolivian operatic soprano.  A native of Cochabamba, Escalera has been an Adler Fellow at the San Francisco Opera, winner of the Aspen Summer Music Festival's Concerto Competition, and placed first in the Lotte Lenya Vocal Competition.  She is known for her vivid, natural stage presence, and versatile, clear voice. Among her recordings are the collaborations with the Florilegium Music Ensemble on Bolivian Baroque Volumes 1 & 2. She is also lyric soprano on Janis Mattox's Solombra.

Escalera was named 2004's Outstanding and Excellent Bolivian Professional by the Human Development Foundation of Bolivia.  She holds both a Bachelor's and Master's in Vocal Performance and Literature from the Eastman School of Music.

Sources
Kohan, Pablo, "Con ayuda de Telemann", La Nación, 3 August 2006 
 Luján, Mónica, Katia Escalera: "Cantar es una adicción", Los Tiempos, 9/08/2009
La Razón, "Un disco da la bienvenida al VI Festival de Música de Chiquitos", 14 September 2005

References

External links 
Janis Mattox and Solombra
Trigonale Music Festival
Searching for Baroque in Bolivia from CBS's Sunday Morning
Review of The Tsar's Bride
La Calisto 2001 Showcase of Adler Fellows
Review of Schwabacher Concert Series 2001

Year of birth missing (living people)
Living people
People from Cochabamba
21st-century Bolivian women singers
Operatic sopranos
21st-century women opera singers